Necydalosaurus ichneumonides is a species of beetle in the family Cerambycidae. It was described by Touroult and Tavakilian in 2008.

References

Oemini
Beetles described in 2008